Krzysztof Stelmaszyk (born 2 March 1959) is a Polish film and television actor.

Filmography
By Touch (1986) as Adam
 Batman: Mask of the Phantasm (1993; theatrical film) - Batman (Polish dubbing)
Złotopolscy (1998–2002; 2004-) as Jerzy Wons
Bulionerzy (2004) as Karol Murawski
Tango z aniołem (2005) as Krzysztof Traczynski
Magda M. (2005–2007) as Wiktor Waligóra
Statyści (2006) as Ochman
Testosterone (2007) as Stavros
The Avengers (2012) as Nick Fury (Polish dubbing)

External links

1959 births
Living people
Male actors from Warsaw
Polish male film actors
Polish male television actors
Polish male voice actors